Sabrina is a feminine given name derived from Proto-Celtic *Sabinā.

It is also the romanization of an unrelated Arabic name,  صابرينا ṣābrīnā, from the root  sabr "patience".

Etymology
The name of the river Severn was recorded as early as the 2nd century in the Latinized form Sabrina. The reconstructed British  form is *sabrinā.
The modern Welsh form  is Hafren or Habren.

Welsh legend

According to a legend recounted by Geoffrey of Monmouth in the 12th century, Habren was the daughter of a king named Locrinus (also known as Locrin or Locrine in English) by his mistress, the Germanic princess Estrildis. Locrinus ruled England after the death of his father, Brutus of Troy, the legendary second founder of Britain. Locrinus cast aside his wife, Guendolen, and their son Maddan and acknowledged Sabrina and her mother, but the enraged Guendolen raised an army against him and defeated Locrinus in battle. Guendolen then ordered that Sabrina and her mother be drowned in the river. The river was named after Sabrina so Locrine's betrayal of Guendolen would never be forgotten. According to legend, Sabrina lives in the river, which reflects her mood. She rides in a chariot and dolphins and salmon swim alongside her. The later story suggests that the legend of Sabrina could have become intermingled with old stories of a river goddess or nymph.

Milton adopted the legend in his Comus (1634), using the Latin form Sabrina.
Fletcher refers to the legend in The Faithful Shepherdess (1608).

Popularity
The use of Sabrina was very rare as a given name in Britain prior to the 19th century, with the singular exception of Sabrina Sidney (1757–1843), an English foundling girl, named for her orphanage overlooking River Severn. 
Its popularity rose, at first in the United States, following the release of the film Sabrina (1954), a romantic drama-comedy based on  Samuel Taylor's Sabrina Fair,  in which the protagonist Sabrina Fairchild was played by Audrey Hepburn.

It was the 789th most popular name for girls born in the United States in 1954, and rose to the 245th most popular name in 1955. 
Dunkling (1983) notes that "[i]n the U.S. Sabrina has tended to displace Sabina since [the 1950s]."

Its use has continued, boosted by the popularity of the comic book character Sabrina the Teenage Witch, who debuted in 1962. 
It had peaks in popularity in 1970 (rank 107) and 1977 (rank 63).
A television series featured the character in 1996, resulting in a renewed peak in 1997 (rank 53). 
The name was ranked as the 427th most popular name for U.S.-born girls in 2018.
The name peaked in popularity in France in 1979–1981 (rank 8) and in Italy in 2001 (rank 35). In Germany, it peaked in popularity at rank 8 in 1987 and 1989.

People
Sabrina Agresti-Roubache (born 1976), French film producer and politician
Sabrina Bartlett (born 1991), English actress 
Sabrina Le Beauf (born 1958), American actress
Sabrina Benaim (born 1992), Canadian writer, performance artist and slam poet
Sabrina Brazzo (born 1968), Italian ballet dancer
Sabrina Bryan (born 1984), American dancer, choreographer, actress and singer
Sabrina Carpenter (born 1999), American singer and actress
Sabrina Dornhoefer (born 1963), American middle-distance runner
Sabrina Erdely (born 1971/1972), American journalist and magazine reporter
Sabrina Ferilli (born 1964), Italian actress
Sabrina Goleš (born 1965), Croatian tennis player
Sabrina Ho Chiu-yeng (born 1990), Hong Kong businesswoman, heiress and philanthropist
Sabrina Ionescu (born 1997), American basketball player
Sabrina Lloyd (born 1970), American actress
Sabrina Mahfouz, British-Egyptian poet
Sabrina Pretto (born 1985), Italian ballet dancer
Sabrina Ricciardi (born 1968), Italian politician
Sabrina Richard (born 1977), French weightlifter
Sabrina Salerno (born 1968),  Italian singer-songwriter, record producer, model, actress and television presenter
Sabrina Sato (born 1981), Brazilian television presenter
Sabrina Sebaihi (born 1981), French politician
Sabrina Sidney (1757–1843), British subject of a 'perfect wife' experiment by Thomas Day
Sabrina Washington (born 1978), British singer

Pseudonyms:
Sabrina Jeffries, pen name of Deborah Gonzales (born 1958), an American author
Sabrina Sabrok, Argentine-Mexican model, pornographic actress and host Lorena Fabiana Colotta (born 1976)

Fictional characters
 Sabrina, a character in John Milton's masque Comus
 Hafren or Sabrina, a mythical nymph
Sabrina Duncan, played by Kate Jackson on the 1976 television series Charlie's Angels
Sabrina Fairchild in Samuel Taylor's Sabrina Fair (1953), played by Audrey Hepburn in the 1954 adaptation Sabrina and by Julia Ormond in the 1995 remake 
Sabrina Grimm, a main character in The Sisters Grimm series of novels (2005 to 2012) written by Michael Buckley
Sabrina Costelana Newman, played by Raya Meddine in the American soap opera The Young and the Restless
Sabrina Santiago, played by Teresa Castillo in the American soap opera General Hospital
Sabrina Spellman, an Archie Comics character who debuted in 1962 in the October issue of Archie's Mad House
played by Jane Webb on the animated television series The Archie Comedy Hour (1969) and Sabrina the Teenage Witch (1970)
played by Melissa Joan Hart on the 1996 television series Sabrina the Teenage Witch
played by Emily Hart on the animated 2000 television series Sabrina: The Animated Series 
played by Kiernan Shipka on the 2018 Netflix Original series Chilling Adventures of Sabrina 
Sabrina, the Gym Leader of Saffron City in the Pokémon franchise, first appearing in 1996
Sabrina, a character in the 2021 Canadian-American movie Mister Sister

See also
Sabrina (disambiguation) for other uses

Notes

English feminine given names